Pauline (Polly) Jacobson is a professor of Cognitive and Linguistic Sciences at Brown University, where she has been since 1977. She is known for her work on variable free semantics, direct compositionality, and transderivationality.

Education 
She completed her Ph.D in Linguistics at the University of California, Berkeley in 1977. Her Thesis was entitled The Syntax of Crossing Coreference Sentences. She completed her A.B. in Anthropology at the University of California, Berkeley in 1968.

Honors 
She has regularly taught at the summer institutes of the Linguistic Society of America and at the European Summer School in Logic, Language and Information (ESSLLI).

In 2022, Jacobson was inducted as a Fellow of the Linguistic Society of America.

Selected publications
Jacobson, Pauline. 1999. "Towards a Variable-Free Semantics", Linguistics and Philosophy, 22, 117-184.
Jacobson, Pauline. 1995. "On the Quantificational Force of English Free Relatives". in E. Bach, E. Jelinek, A. Kratzer, and B. Partee (eds.), Quantification in Natural Languages, pp. 451–486. Kluwer Academic Publishers, Dordrecht. .
Jacobson, Pauline. 2000. "Paycheck pronouns, Bach-Peters sentences, and variable-free semantics". Natural Language Semantics, 8, 77-155.
Jacobson, Pauline. "Raising as Function Composition". 1990. Linguistics and Philosophy, 13, 423-475.
Jacobson, Pauline and Geoffrey K. Pullum. 1982. The Nature of Syntactic Representation. Springer.

References

External links
"Polly Jacobson's personal website"

American cognitive scientists
Women cognitive scientists
Women linguists
Living people
Brown University faculty
University of California, Berkeley alumni
Semanticists
Linguists from the United States
Year of birth missing (living people)
Fellows of the Linguistic Society of America